Johnson Stadium at Doubleday Field is a baseball venue located on the campus of the United States Military Academy, in West Point, New York.  It is the home of the Army Black Knights baseball team.

History
Doubleday Field was named after Abner Doubleday, a member of the West Point Class of 1842. The field was dedicated in May 1939, which was celebrated by the American League and National League as the centennial year of baseball.

The field hosted the 2012 Patriot League baseball tournament Championship Series, in which Army defeated Holy Cross two games to one.

1996 renovation
After an extensive renovation, the new Johnson Stadium at Doubleday Field was formally dedicated on September 13, 1996. The project included new locker rooms, training rooms, clubhouse facilities, and 880 fixed chair-back seats.

Cadets
Along the visitors bullpen there is usually a group of present and former cadets from the United States Military Academy, who are known to give opposing teams (and umpires) a hard time.

Sights
Johnson Stadium is placed in the heart of West Point. Behind right field you can see the library and other buildings, and behind left field is Cullum Hall.

In 2012, college baseball writer Eric Sorenson ranked the facility as the third best setting in Division I baseball.

See also
 List of NCAA Division I baseball venues

References

External links
Baseball. Army Black Knights official website. Retrieved 2010-05-28.

College baseball venues in the United States
Army Black Knights baseball
Sports venues in New York (state)
Sports venues in Orange County, New York
1939 establishments in New York (state)
Sports venues completed in 1939
Baseball venues in New York (state)